The Election Commission of India held indirect 3rd presidential elections of India on 7 May 1962. Dr. Sarvepalli Radhakrishnan with 553,067 votes won the presidency over his rivals Chowdhry Hari Ram who got 6,341 votes and Yamuna Prasad Trisulia who got 3,537 votes.

Schedule
The election schedule was announced by the Election Commission of India on 6 April 1962.

Results
Source: Web archive of Election Commission of India website

See also
 1962 Indian vice presidential election

References

1962 elections in India
Presidential elections in India